Mike Conroy (born August 28, 1950) is a Canadian former professional ice hockey player. During the 1975–76 season, Conroy played four games in the World Hockey Association with the Cleveland Crusaders.

References

External links

1950 births
Living people
Canadian ice hockey centres
Clarkson Golden Knights men's ice hockey players
Cleveland Crusaders players
Greensboro Generals (SHL) players
Ice hockey people from Ontario
Omaha Knights (CHL) players
Sportspeople from North Bay, Ontario
Syracuse Blazers players